The 2012 Western Michigan Broncos football team represented Western Michigan University in the 2012 NCAA Division I FBS football season. They were led by eighth-year head coach Bill Cubit and played their home games at Waldo Stadium as a member of the West Division of the Mid-American Conference (MAC). In 2011, the Broncos finished at 7–6 (5–3 MAC), third place in the MAC West division.

Western Michigan fired Cubit on November 17, 2012, following a season-ending loss to Eastern Michigan. WMU finished the year 4–8, its worst record since 2004. P. J. Fleck, 32-year-old Tampa Bay Buccaneers assistant, was named head coach on December 18, 2012.

Schedule

Source: Schedule

Game summaries

At Illinois

First quarter scoring: ILL – Ryan Lankford received a 64-yard pass from Nick Scheelhaase (Nick Immekus kick); Immekus kicked 43-yard field goal.

Second quarter scoring: ILL – Scheelhaase 4-yard run (Immekus kick).

Third quarter scoring: WMU – Jaime Wilson received an 8-yard pass from Alex Carder (Andrew Haldeman kick).

4th quarter scoring: ILL – Ashante Williams returned a 60-yard interception (Immekus kick).

Eastern Illinois

Referee for the game was Tony Canella.

At Minnesota

Connecticut

Toledo

Massachusetts

At Ball State

At Kent State

Northern Illinois

At Central Michigan

At Buffalo

Eastern Michigan

References

Western Michigan
Western Michigan Broncos football seasons
Western Michigan Broncos football